Shahid Sadoughi University of Medical Sciences is a public university located in the center of Iran in the World Heritage city of Yazd. The university offers degrees in 102 programs in medicine, dentistry, pharmacy, nursing, midwifery, paramedical sciences, and health services ranging from associate degrees to sub-specialties and fellowships. The university administers 9 hospitals and over 90 clinics throughout the city and province of Yazd.

History 

Shahid Sadoughi University of Medical Sciences was the first Iranian medical university founded after Islamic revolution by 45 medical students. The department was then converted into a University of Medical Sciences by the Ministry of Health and Medical Education in 1994. To date, over 20000 health professionals have been graduated from SSU in all branches of health care, including health, medicine, dentistry, pharmacy, nursing, midwifery, and paramedical sciences.

Overview 
The University serves in these four areas of expertise: education, research, health promotion, and clinical affairs.

According to Iran's health care system, the president of medical sciences university in each province is in charge of the whole health care system and related educational affairs of that province. Therefore, the following facilities are supervised by the president:

• University schools

• Research centers

• Health centers

• Hospitals and clinics

• Pharmacies

• Laboratories

• Food and drug associations

Academic programs 

 102 Degree Programs
 Professional Doctorates
 Medicine, Dentistry, Pharmacy
 Undergraduate Programs
 2 Associate Degree
 19 Bachelor's Degree
 Postgraduate Programs
 32 Master's Degree
 17 Medical Specialties
 10 Dental Specialties
 1 Medical Sub-specialty
 10 Ph.D. by Course
 5 Ph.D. by Research
 2 Fellowships
 1 MPH
 21 Non-Degree Programs with scholarship

Schools 
1. International Campus

2. Medicine

3. Dentistry

4. Pharmacy

5. Public Health

6. Nursing and Midwifery

7. Paramedical Sciences

8. Traditional Medicine

9. Nursing (Meybod)

10. Paramedical Sciences (Abarkooh)

Research Centers 
1. Research and Clinical Center for Infertility

2. Stem Cell Biology

3. Recurrent Abortion

4. Cardiovascular Diseases

5. Diabetes

6. Industry-Caused Diseases

7. Social Determinants of Health

8. Health and Food Safety

9. Infectious and Tropical Diseases

10. Social Determinants of Oral Health

11. Hematology and Oncology

12. Otorhinolaryngology

13. Children Growth Disorders

14. Nursing and Midwifery Care

15. Reproductive Immunology

16. Trauma

Other facilities 

 15 Dormitory sites accommodating over 2000 students (FREE Accommodations with optional VIP services for International Students)
 13 Libraries with over 124,000 books and access to electronic resources
 17 Journals
 56 School Laboratories
 5 University Hospitals
 University Language Center
 Various sport facilities

See also 

 Higher Education in Iran

External links
Official website
 Farsi Wikipedia University دانشگاه علوم پزشکی و خدمات بهداشتی درمانی شهید صدوقی یزد

Shahid S*
Shahid S*
Educational institutions established in 1983
Education in Yazd Province
1983 establishments in Iran
Buildings and structures in Yazd Province
Health education